Mohamed Amine Hamia (born October 6, 1989) is an Algerian professional football player. He plays for Al-Diwaniya FC.

Club career

Olympique de Médéa

CR Belouizdad

USM Alger
On January 15, Hamia joined to USM Alger for three seasons, coming from the neighbor CR Belouizdad. He made his debut for the team in the Ligue 1 during a win against DRB Tadjenanet. and later  played only four games until the end of the season, At the beginning of the new season he was expected to leave the team but leaving a large number of players, most notably striker Oussama Darfalou, considered by the administration to be his replacement and in his first game of the season. Against Rayon Sports he participated as a substitute and scored the equalizer, his first since joining. After the match Hamia was injured and with sparkling colleague Prince Ibara, he is no longer involved only when he is injured or absent On 30 October 2018, in his debut as a starter in the Ligue 1 against his former team Olympique de Médéa and scored a brace for The Reds and Blacks. then he participated in several games as a basic until the game of Al-Merrikh, where he was the worst player in the games and was criticized by the supporters Which demanded his release after the game and on his Facebook page Hamia apologized for his performance, saying he was not in his day.

Career statistics

Club

Honours

Club
 CR Belouizdad
 Algerian Cup (1): 2017

 Olympique de Médéa
 Algerian Ligue Professionnelle 2 (1): 2015-16
 Topscorer of 2015–16 Algerian Ligue Professionnelle 2

 USM Alger
 Algerian Ligue Professionnelle 1 (1): 2018–19

References

External links
 

1989 births
Algerian Ligue Professionnelle 1 players
Algerian footballers
Living people
JSM Skikda players
Olympique de Médéa players
CR Belouizdad players
USM Alger players
MC Oran players
People from El Harrach District
Association football forwards
21st-century Algerian people